Mansfield Airport  is located  south southeast of Mansfield, Ontario, Canada.

References

Registered aerodromes in Ontario